The Serbian Women's Volleyball Cup is an Official women's volleyball competition in Serbia, it was first introduced in the year of 2007,  teams from all around divisions compete in this tournament, OK Crvena Zvezda is the most successful team with 5 titles record.

Competition history

Winners list

Honours By Club

References

External links
   Serbian Volleyball Federation   

Volleyball in Serbia